Barbari (AMC Area) is a census town part of Dibrugarh city

Demographics
 India census, Barbari (AMC Area) had a population of 5282. Males constitute 63% of the population and females 37%. Barbari (AMC Area) has an average literacy rate of 80%, higher than the national average of 59.5%; with 66% of the males and 34% of females literate. 11% of the population is under 6 years of age.

References

Cities and towns in Dibrugarh district
Dibrugarh